John le Carré: The Biography is a 2015 biography of John le Carré written by Adam Sisman It was published by Bloomsbury (UK), Harper (US) and Knopf (Canada).

References

Books about writers
2015 non-fiction books
English-language books
John le Carré
Bloomsbury Publishing books
HarperCollins books
Knopf Canada books